Fork-tailed swift is the historic name of a kind of bird which has since been divided taxonomically into four species. It could refer to any of four different species of swifts:

Pacific swift, Apus pacificus
Salim Ali's swift, Apus salimali
Blyth's swift, Apus leuconyx
Cook's swift, Apus cooki

Birds by common name